Mikhnyovo is a rural locality (a selo) and the administrative center of Mikhnyovskoye Rural Settlement, Nizhnedevitsky District, Voronezh Oblast, Russia. The population was 470 as of 2010. There are 6 streets.

Geography 
Mikhnyovo is located 19 km southeast of Nizhnedevitsk (the district's administrative centre) by road. Glazovo is the nearest rural locality.

References 

Rural localities in Nizhnedevitsky District